The Fremont Unified School District Alternative Schools are a collaboration of three alternative schools within the Fremont Unified School District.

Circle of Independent Learning Charter School
The Circle of Independent Learning is a charter school that is a resource for home school families.

Robertson High School
Robertson High School is the alternative school for those who were not successful at their respective high schools. The program is designed to allow students the opportunity to make up academic deficiencies and provide a program to complete classes in an accelerated manner, with students earning up to 90 credits per year. Students may take additional coursework either on campus, at ROP, or adult school.

Vista Alternative
Vista Alternative is an additional campus at the facility. This school provides teacher-supervised, self-paced programs for students who are not able to physically attend a school every day.

References

Alternative schools in California
Fremont Unified School District
Education in Fremont, California